"She Don't Fool Me" is a single released by the British Rock band Status Quo in 1982. It was included on the album 1+9+8+2.

Track listing 
 "She Don't Fool Me" (Parfitt/Bown) (4.30)
 "Never Too Late" (Rossi/Frost) (3.57)

Charts

References 

Status Quo (band) songs
1982 singles
Songs written by Rick Parfitt
Songs written by Andy Bown
1982 songs
Vertigo Records singles